Camden Town with Primrose Hill was a ward in the London Borough of Camden, in the United Kingdom. The ward was created for the May 2002 local elections. At the 2011 Census the population of the ward was 12,613. The ward was abolished at the 2022 election. Most of its area became part of the newly created Camden Town and Primrose Hill wards, with some areas becoming part of the St Pancras and Somers Town ward.

Councillors
Three councillors represented Camden Town with Primrose Hill ward between 2002 and 2022.

*The by-election was called following the resignation of Cllr Justin Barnard 10 days after the election, due to him relocating to Norfolk. His term lasted 1 month and 18 days.

Elections

2018 election

2014 election

2010 election

2006 election

2002 by-election

The by-election was called following the resignation of Cllr Justin Barnard.

2002 election

References

Former wards of the London Borough of Camden
2002 establishments in England
2022 disestablishments in England
Camden Town
Primrose Hill